Catena (Latin for chain) or catenae (plural) may refer to:

Science
Catena (fly), a genus in the family Tachinidae
Catena (linguistics) is a unit of syntax and morphology, closely associated with dependency grammars
Catena (computing), number of bits transferred in one cycle
Catenary, a type of curve in mathematics
Crater chain, a line of craters along the surface of an astronomical body 
Farmacia Catena, a trade name of the drug idebenone
Catena (soil) in pedology, a sequence of soil profiles down a slope
Catena (cryptography), a cryptographic algorithm used as a key derivation function

Publishing
Catena (soil science journal), published by Elsevier
Catena Paperback, published by E. Schweizerbart
Catena Supplements, published by E. Schweizerbart
CATENA: Magazine of the Catenian Association
Catena Media, an online media company in Malta

Other uses
Catena (surname)
Catena (biblical commentary), a verse-by-verse biblical commentary
Catena, San Miniato, a village in the province of Pisa, Italy
A prayer said daily by members of the Legion of Mary
International Masonic Union Catena, a masonic organization
A term for the bass bar

See also